Kontraskjæret is a tram stop on the Vika Line. The station opened in 1995 as the name Rådhusplassen; From 2015, the station has closed due to maintenance works on the Vika Line and opened again with the name Kontraskjæret. The station is close to Rådhusbrygge 1 (Aker Brygge platf. F)

Services 
The station is served by Line 12, in the Vika Line of the Oslo Tramway.

External links 
 Ruter’s website
 Route maps

Oslo Tramway stations in Oslo
Railway stations opened in 1995